Peter MacDonald may refer to:

 Peter Macdonald (Canadian politician) (1835–1923), Canadian Liberal MP for Huron East, Ontario, first elected in 1887
 Peter Macdonald (Conservative politician) (1895–1961), MP for the Isle of Wight (1924–1959)
 Peter MacDonald (Navajo leader) (born 1928), former Navajo tribal chairman
 Peter MacDonald (director), British director
 Peter Macdonald (Australian politician) (born 1943), former Mayor of Manly; former independent member of New South Wales Legislative Assembly for Manly
 Peter MacDonald (computer programmer) (born 1957), early Linux programmer
 Peter MacDonald (footballer) (born 1980), Scottish professional football player
 Peter Fitzallan MacDonald (1830–1919), Member of the Queensland Legislative Assembly, Australia
 Peter MacDonald (Scottish clergyman), former Leader of the Iona Community

See also
Peter McDonald (disambiguation)